Milan Todorović (born October 2, 1981) is a Serbian film director and producer, best known as the creator of the first Serbian zombie movie, Zone of the Dead.

Early life
He finished film school for directing at the Center for Visual Communications Kvadrat in Belgrade and later on graduated with a degree in Film and TV Production from the Faculty of Dramatic Arts in Belgrade in 2006. Todorović worked as the producer and the director on several short films prior to founding his own production company.

Career
Since 2005. he is the head of Talking Wolf Productions, a film production company, which he co-founded with Vukota Brajovic. In 2009. he conceived, produced and co-directed with Milan Konjević feature horror film Zone of the Dead, starring Ken Foree, for which he has been awarded as the best producer of the year at the "Producers' Day" ceremony held by the Faculty of Dramatic Arts, Belgrade.

Filmography
 Zone of the Dead (2009)
 Mamula (2014)
 Tapavica (2016)
 The Outpost (2019)
 The Ark (2023)

Awards
Luconosa (2009) best producer of the year

References

External links 

 
 
 

Living people
1981 births
Serbian film directors
Serbian film producers
University of Belgrade Faculty of Dramatic Arts alumni